Grevillea × gaudichaudii is a hybrid species of flowering plant in the family Proteaceae and is endemic to a restricted area of New South Wales. It is a prostrate shrub with deeply lobed leaves and toothbrush-like groups of dark pink to burgundy-red flowers. The plant is a popular garden ground-cover.

Description
Grevillea × gaudichaudii is a naturally occurring hybrid between Grevillea acanthifolia subsp. acanthifolia and Grevillea laurifolia, growing as a prostrate plant  in diameter. Its leaves are pinnately-lobed, the lobes oblong to egg-shaped and softly-hairy on the lower surface but not sharply pointed. Flowering occurs from October to December.

Taxonomy
Grevillea × gaudichaudii was first formally described in 1827 by Charles Gaudichaud-Beaupré in Voyage autour du monde, entrepris par ordre du roi from an unpublished description by Robert Brown of plants collected in the Jamieson Valley (near Katoomba).

Distribution and habitat
This grevillea grows in sandy soil and is restricted to parts of the higher Blue Mountains.

Use in horticulture
A fast-growing ground cover, this grevillea is frost-resistant and tolerates most soil types, preferring sunny sites in well-drained soil. It can be grown from cuttings.

References

gaudichaudii
Flora of New South Wales
Plant nothospecies
Proteales of Australia
Garden plants of Australia
Taxa named by Charles Gaudichaud-Beaupré
Plants described in 1827